Hmone Shwe Yee, is a 1970 Burmese black-and-white drama film starring Win Oo, Khin Than Nu and Aung Lwin. The film won the Best Picture Award and Win Oo won the Best Actor Award in 1970 Myanmar Motion Picture Academy Awards.

The film's namesake comes from an eponymous song, which was written by an anonymous composer in the early 20th century. It remains a popular classic performed on radio and performances, including a prominent cover by a classical singer named Tin Tin Mya.

Cast
Win Oo as Myint Thu
Sandar Lin as Sandar Lin (his daughter)
Myat Thu as Myat Thu (his son)
Khin Than Nu as Khin Hmone (his wife)
Aung Lwin as Captain Ye Aung
Phoe Par Gyi as Ko Par Gyi
Khin Lay Swe as Khin Lay Swe

References

External links

1970 films
1970s Burmese-language films
Films shot in Myanmar
Burmese black-and-white films
1970 drama films
Burmese drama films